Allium umbilicatum is a species of flowering plant in the family Amaryllidaceae. It is a wild onion native to Pakistan, Afghanistan, Turkmenistan, Uzbekistan, Iran, and Tajikistan. It is a herbaceous perennial up to 40 cm tall, with an egg-shaped bulb up to 15 mm long. The leaves are tubular. The umbels are hemispherical and densely crowded with many pink flowers.

References

umbilicatum
Onions
Flora of temperate Asia
Plants described in 1859
Taxa named by Pierre Edmond Boissier